The Dock Brief (US title Trial and Error) is a 1962 black-and-white British legal satire directed by James Hill, starring Peter Sellers and Richard Attenborough, and based on the play of the same name written by John Mortimer (creator of Horace Rumpole).

The film had its world premiere on 20 September 1962 at the Plaza Theatre in London's West End.

Richard Attenborough was nominated for the 1963 BAFTA Award for best British actor for his role.

Plot
In a cell under the Old Bailey, two men meet. One is Wilfred Morgenhall, a single barrister who never gets any cases and is overjoyed to have won this dock brief, the defence of an accused individual with no lawyer (at public expense). The other is his client Herbert Fowle, an insignificant man who just wants to plead guilty to murdering his wife and get it all over.

Flashbacks show that the wife was impossible to live with and Fowle, who avoided her as much as possible, hatched a plot to get rid of her by taking in a male lodger. The lodger found her amusing and attractive, until one day he went too far and Mrs Fowle threw him out of the house. In despair at his plot having failed, Fowle killed her.

Morgenhall role plays various defences, in the process raising Fowle's will to fight. But when the case is called, he botches it and Fowle is found guilty. Morgenhall goes to visit him in prison, where he learns that Fowle has been reprieved because his defence was so poor. The two leave together, two lonely and inadequate men who have become friends.

Cast
 Peter Sellers as Wilfred Morgenhall, barrister
 Richard Attenborough as Herbert Fowle, the accused murderer
 Beryl Reid as Doris Fowle, his late wife
 David Lodge as Frank Bateson, the lodger
 Frank Pettingell as Tuppy Morgan, solicitor
 Audrey Nicholson as Morgenhall's girl (in flashback)
 Tristram Jellinek as Mr. Perkins, the prosecutor
 Eric Woodburn as Judge Banter
 John Waite as clerk of the court
 Patrick Newell as 1st warder
 Henry Kay as 2nd warder
 Frank Thornton as photographer at the Fowle wedding
 Eric Dodson as examiner

Production
Pierre Rouve wrote the script. He opened up the play for cinema by using flashbacks.

Filming took place in March and April 1962 at Shepperton Studios in London. John Mortimer said that Peter Sellers wanted to play the role in a north county accent and the director James Hill had to coax him back "to what I felt were undoubtedly... southern origins" of his character.

Reception

Box Office
According to MGM records, the film made a profit of $141,000.

Critical
The MFB called it "refreshingly original".

The Guardian called it "excellent".

The new York Times called it "a good second hand excursion into the realm of character comedy."

Quotes
Morgenhall: "Now you're the only case I've got, and the most difficult."

The New York Times: "Charming, comic...robustly amusing." (quoted from the DVD cover)

References

External links

The Dock Brief at BFI

1962 films
British black-and-white films
Films set in London
Metro-Goldwyn-Mayer films
1962 comedy films
Works by John Mortimer
Films directed by James Hill (British director)
Films produced by Dimitri de Grunwald
1960s English-language films